Norman Percy Allen  (5 June 1903 – 23 February 1972) was a British metallurgist.

Early life
He was born in Wrexham, North Wales, the son of accountant Sidney Edward Allen and educated at Burton-on-Trent Boys' Grammar School and Sheffield University, where he obtained an honours degree in metallurgy.

Career
He stayed on at Sheffield to carry out research into copper die-casting alloys, but in 1925 moved to Swansea University to work for three years on the porosity of copper and copper alloys, moving again in 1929 to Birmingham University to continue the work. He was awarded a D.Sc. by Birmingham University in 1934.

In 1933 he left the university to join Mond Nickel Company at their Birmingham research laboratory under Dr Leonard Bessemer Pfeil, where he stayed until 1945. During that time he worked on the development of highly alloyed nickel base materials Nimonic having high strength and high oxidation resistance at elevated temperatures which served a key role in the use of such alloys in the new jet engines.

In 1945, he joined the National Physical Laboratory (NPL) as Superintendent of the Metallurgy Division, where he stayed until his retirement in 1969. A major project there concerned the development of superconductors, their manufacture, use and ongoing development. Other projects involved the development of physical methods of analysis such as spectrographic analysis, chromatography, colorimetry, X-ray fluorescence and absorption spectrometry. In 1966 he was appointed Deputy Director of the NPL.

Honours and awards
He was elected a Fellow of the Royal Society in 1956 and elected President of the Institution of Metallurgists for 1961/62. He was invested as a Companion of the Order of the Bath (CB) in the 1966 Birthday Honours.

Private life
He died in 1972. He had married in 1929 Olive Williams, with whom he had 2 sons and a daughter,

References

1903 births
1972 deaths
Alumni of the University of Sheffield
British metallurgists
Academics of the University of Birmingham
Companions of the Order of the Bath
Fellows of the Royal Society